Dov Carmel (Hebrew: דוב כרמל) is a composer and arranger (born Budapest, 1932), who began producing compositions during the 1960s.

Biographical information
His education began with Ilona Feher whom he studied violin with at the age of nine. His studies were interrupted by the Holocaust between 1944 and 1945, but he was able to resume them afterwards. Happily he won at a competition in Debrecen for young musicians.

Later, his parents moved to Kibbutz Dalya in Israel. An Aliyat Hanoar scholarship enabled him to continue his studies in the vicinity of Haifa. Living here he continued with studies at the Music Institute of Oranim Teachers' College under the direction of professors Abel Ehrlich and Yizhak Sadai.

Between 1954 and 1971 he taught at schools in Israel, including 1971-1992 at Oranim. He won the ACUM Prize in 1969 for orchestral composition and the  Kibbutz Movement Competition Prize in 1972.

Carmel began composing music during his thirties, with a debut performance in Tel Aviv.

See also
Counterpoint
Orchestration
Ear training

References 

1932 births
Living people
Musicians from Budapest
Hungarian composers
Hungarian male composers
Oranim Academic College alumni
Academic staff of Oranim Academic College
Music arrangers